Julio Pablo Rodríguez Cristóbal (born August 9, 1977 in Juan Lacaze, Uruguay) is a Uruguayan footballer. He currently is a playmaker for Real España.

Career

Real España 
On 7 August 2010, Rodriguez made his debut in the Liga Nacional de Futbol de Honduras with Real España against Vida in a 1-3 win.

External links
 
 

1978 births
Living people
People from Juan Lacaze
Uruguayan people of Spanish descent
Uruguayan footballers
2001 Copa América players
Uruguay international footballers
Uruguayan expatriate footballers
Grêmio Foot-Ball Porto Alegrense players
Incheon United FC players
Club Nacional de Football players
Centro Atlético Fénix players
Defensor Sporting players
Associação Atlética Ponte Preta players
Montevideo Wanderers F.C. players
Alki Larnaca FC players
C.D. Antofagasta footballers
Real C.D. España players
Uruguayan Primera División players
Cypriot First Division players
Liga Nacional de Fútbol Profesional de Honduras players
Expatriate footballers in Brazil
Expatriate footballers in Cyprus
Expatriate footballers in Chile
Expatriate footballers in South Korea
Expatriate footballers in Honduras

Association football midfielders
Association football forwards